"Al otro lado del río" is a song, written and performed by Uruguayan singer Jorge Drexler for the film The Motorcycle Diaries (2004). Besides the film's soundtrack, it can also be found in Drexler's seventh album Eco; on the soundtrack, the bassist Jeff Eckels also performed.

Credits and personnel
 Written and Performed by Jorge Drexler
 Produced by Jorge Drexler and Leo Sidran
 Guitar, Programming and Vocals: Jorge Drexler
 Bass: Jeff Eckels
 Cello: Carina Voly
 Violin: John Vriesacker
 Background Vocals: Ana Laan
 Percussion, Programming, Piano: Leo Sidran
 Piano: Ben Sidran
 Recorded and Mixed by Mark Haines at Smart Studios, Madison, WI
 Additional Recording by Hector Coulon at UML Studios

Academy Award
"Al otro lado del río" received the Academy Award for Best Original Song at the 77th Academy Awards, becoming the first song in Spanish, the second in a foreign language, to receive such an honor, and the first by a Uruguayan artist.

The Oscars ceremony producers would not let the then relatively unknown Drexler perform the song during the show for fear of losing ratings. Instead, the song was performed by the more well known Carlos Santana and Antonio Banderas, who were introduced by Salma Hayek.  Drexler's acceptance speech for the award consisted of him singing a few lines of his song a cappella, and closed by simply saying Chau!.

Awards and nominations
Won: Academy Award for Best Original Song
Nominated: Latin Grammy Award for Song of the Year

References

External links

Lyrics (in original Spanish) and English translation

2004 songs
Jorge Drexler songs
Best Original Song Academy Award-winning songs
Spanish-language songs
Songs written by Jorge Drexler
Latin pop songs